The 2018 Torneo Internacional Challenger León was a professional tennis tournament played on hard courts. It was the sixteenth edition of the tournament which was part of the 2018 ATP Challenger Tour. It took place in León, Mexico between 23 and 29 April 2018.

Singles main-draw entrants

Seeds

 1 Rankings are as of April 16, 2018.

Other entrants
The following players received wildcards into the singles main draw:
  Tigre Hank
  Luis Patiño
  José Antonio Rodríguez Rodríguez
  Manuel Sánchez

The following players received entry from the qualifying draw:
  Roberto Cid Subervi
  Roberto Quiroz
  Rubin Statham
  James Ward

The following player received entry as a lucky loser:
  Tobias Simon

Champions

Singles

 Christopher Eubanks def.  John-Patrick Smith 6–4, 3–6, 7–6(7–4).

Doubles

 Gonzalo Escobar /  Manuel Sánchez def.  Bradley Mousley /  John-Patrick Smith 6–4, 6–4.

External links
Official Website

Torneo Internacional Challenger León
2018
2018 in Mexican tennis